Roger A. Powell is a retired male badminton player from England.

Career
Powell won the gold medal at the 1968 European Badminton Championships in men's doubles with David Eddy. They were men's doubles runners-up at the prestigious All-England Championships in both 1969 and 1970.

References 

English male badminton players
Living people
Sportspeople from Wirral
Year of birth missing (living people)